Shelter Insurance Company is a mutual insurance company which focuses on auto, property, business, and life Insurance. It operates in fifteen U.S. states and the headquarters is in Columbia, Missouri.

Shelter was founded in 1946 as the insurance subsidiary of the Missouri Farmers Association (the same company as MFA Incorporated), and was called MFA Mutual Insurance Company. The Shelter name came from the company's slogan, "M.F.A. is your Shield of Shelter". In 1981, the name was changed to Shelter Insurance Companies. The company's headquarters remained in Columbia. The Shelter Insurance Gardens are located at the company headquarters in Columbia.

Closing of Shelter Financial Bank 
In September 2012 Shelter announced the nko closure of Shelter Financial Bank. Though profitable, the announcement cited the additional costs associated with the Dodd–Frank Wall Street Reform and Consumer Protection Act as the primary reason for closure.

References

Financial services companies established in 1946
American companies established in 1946
1946 establishments in Missouri
Reinsurance companies
Companies based in Columbia, Missouri
Mutual insurance companies of the United States